The secretary of state of Idaho is one of the constitutional officers of the U.S. state of Idaho.  It is an elected position within the executive branch of the state government.  The current secretary of state is Phil McGrane.

Duties of the secretary of state

Electoral
The secretary is responsible for the administration of elections and regulation of lobbying and campaign finance.

Economic
The secretary's office registers business entities, files liens under the Uniform Commercial Code, and registers trademarks and service marks within the state.

Administrative and governmental
The secretary is the keeper of the Great Seal of Idaho, and as such is responsible for licensing notaries public, as well as authenticating documents and issuing apostilles.  The secretary's office also provides information and publications to the general public, including the Idaho Blue Book, and is also an ex officio member of the Idaho Code Commission.  The secretary also administers the Idaho Will Registry, the Idaho Health Care Directive Registry (for such documents as living wills and medical powers of attorney), and the state's Address Confidentiality Program.

List of secretaries of state of Idaho
Party designations: (R) = Republican; (D) = Democrat; (S.R.) = Silver Republican

See also

 List of company registers

References

External links
 Official homepage of the Idaho Secretary of State
 Official Idaho voters' website, operated by the Idaho Secretary of State
 List of statewide elected officers of Idaho